Bruno Agra (born September 1, 1980 in Rio de Janeiro, Brazil) is formerly drummer of the American rock band We Are Harlot and also Aquaria and Revolution Renaissance.

Musical career

Aquaria (1999-2007) 
Bruno begun as drummer of the Brazilian symphonic power metal-band Aquaria formerly known as Uirapuru. With Aquaria he released two studioalbums, Luxaeterna in 2005 and Shambala in 2007. As Uirapuru they recorded two demos.

Revolution Renaissance (2010) 

Bruno Agra provided drums for the third album, Trinity of the band Revolution Renaissance as a full member, however the band was disbanded that same year.

We Are Harlot (2011-present) 

Agra joined the band in their formation year of 2011 after he was invited by members Danny Worsnop and Jeff George to write music with them. Since then they have recruited Brian Weaver intend to release their debut album in March 2015.

Discography
 With Uirapuru
 Here Comes The Life (Demo, 2001)
 Flames of Trinity (Demo, 2002)

 With Aquaria
 Luxaeterna (2005)
 Shambala (2007)

 With Revolution Renaissance
 Demos (2008)
 Age Of Aquarius (2009)
 Trinity (2010)

With We Are Harlot
 We Are Harlot – (2015)

References 

1980 births
American hard rock musicians
Brazilian heavy metal drummers
Living people
Musicians from Rio de Janeiro (city)
21st-century drummers